Events from the year 1912 in the United States.

Incumbents

Federal Government 
 President: William Howard Taft (R-Ohio)
 Vice President: James S. Sherman (R-New York) (until October 30), vacant (starting October 30)
 Chief Justice: Edward Douglass White (Louisiana)
 Speaker of the House of Representatives: Champ Clark (D-Missouri)
 Congress: 62nd

Events

January

 January 6 – New Mexico is admitted as the 47th U.S. state (see History of New Mexico).
 January 11–March 12 – 1912 Lawrence textile strike ("Bread and Roses" strike): Immigrant textile workers in Lawrence, Massachusetts, strike in response to a pay cut corresponding to a new law shortening the working week.
 January 22 – The Overseas Railroad opens: the first train arrives in Key West, Florida, at 10:43 a.m. with Henry M. Flagler, the railroad's creator and owner, aboard.

February
 February 14 – Arizona is admitted as the 48th U.S. state and the last of contiguous states to be admitted into the Union (see History of Arizona).

March
 March 1 – Albert Berry makes the world's first or second parachute jump from an airplane in flight, at Jefferson Barracks Military Post in Missouri.
 March 6 – Oreo cookies introduced.
 March 12 – The Girl Scouts of the USA are founded by Juliette Gordon Low, in Savannah, Georgia.
 March 27 – Mayor Yukio Ozaki of Tokyo gives 3,000 cherry blossom trees to be planted in Washington, D.C., to symbolize the friendship between the two countries.

April
 April 10 – The British ocean liner  leaves Southampton, England on her maiden voyage for New York City.
 April 14–15 – Sinking of the RMS Titanic:  strikes an iceberg in the northern Atlantic Ocean and sinks with the loss of between 1,517 and 1,636 lives. The wreck will not be discovered until 1985.
 April 18 – The Cunard liner  arrives in New York City with s 706 survivors.
 April 19 – The United States Senate initiates an official inquiry into the  disaster, hastily issuing subpoenas for White Star personnel before they can return to the United Kingdom.
 April 20 – Baseball parks opened:
Tiger Stadium (Detroit) as Navin Field.
Fenway Park, home of the Boston Red Sox.

May
 May 6 – Suffragettes and their supporters parade in New York City.
 May 8 – Adolph Zukor founds Famous Players Film Company, now Paramount Pictures.
 May 11 – Alaska is constituted as a territory of the U.S.
 May 18 – The Detroit Tigers go on strike to protest the suspension of Ty Cobb. A replacement team recruited from the coaching staff and local colleges is fielded to avoid a forfeiture to the Philadelphia A's in a lopsided loss.
 May 30 – Joe Dawson wins the 1912 Indianapolis 500-Mile Race for automobiles (the second held) after Ralph DePalma's Mercedes breaks down within sight of the finish.

June
 June 5 – U.S. Marines land in Cuba.
 June 6–8 – Mount Novarupta erupts in Alaska.
 June 8 – Carl Laemmle founds Universal Studios as the Universal Film and Manufacturing Company in New York City, moving production to Hollywood by the end of the year
 June 9 – The Villisca axe murders take place in Villisca, Iowa
 June 18 – The Republican National Convention nominates incumbent President William Howard Taft in Chicago, defeating a challenge by former President Theodore Roosevelt, whose delegates bolt the convention.
 June 25 – The Democratic National Convention nominates New Jersey Governor Woodrow Wilson in Baltimore.

July
 July 1 – Harriet Quimby, who set the record as the first woman to fly the English Channel only 2 months before, dies in Squantum, Massachusetts after her brand-new two-seat Bleriot monoplane crashes, killing both Quimby and her passenger.
 July 19 – A meteorite with an estimated mass of 190 kg explodes over the town of Holbrook in Navajo County, Arizona causing thousands of pieces of debris to rain down on the town.

August
 August 5 –  Dissident U.S. Republicans form the Progressive Party, also known as the Bull Moose Party, and nominate former President Theodore Roosevelt as their presidential candidate.
 August 21 – The first Eagle Scout (Boy Scouts of America) earns his rank.

September
 September 25 – The Columbia University Graduate School of Journalism is founded in New York City.
 September 28 – Composer W. C. Handy publishes his "Southern rag" "The Memphis Blues".

October
 October 14 – While campaigning in Milwaukee, Wisconsin, former President Theodore Roosevelt is shot by saloonkeeper John Schrank. With a fresh flesh wound and the bullet still in him, Roosevelt delivers his scheduled speech. After finishing it, he goes to the hospital, where it is deduced that if he had not had his speech in his breast pocket when he was shot, he most likely would have died.
 October 16 – The Boston Red Sox, assisted by a famous error, defeat the New York Giants in extra innings to win the 1912 World Series in what is considered one of the greatest games of baseball ever played.
 October 30 – Vice President James S. Sherman dies of kidney failure just days prior to the U.S. presidential election.

November
 November 4 – The keel is laid for dreadnought battleship  at Fore River Shipyard in Quincy, Massachusetts.
 November 5 – U.S. presidential election, 1912: Democratic challenger and Governor of New Jersey Woodrow Wilson wins a landslide victory over Republican incumbent William Howard Taft. Taft's base is undercut by Progressive Party candidate (and former Republican) Theodore Roosevelt, who finishes second, ahead of Taft.

Undated
 The American Little Theatre Movement begins with the founding of the Toy Theatre in Boston and the Little Theatre of Chicago.
 Remaining residents of Malaga Island, off the coast of Maine, are forcibly evicted.
 First Sea Scout groups under the aegis of the Boy Scouts of America established this summer.

Ongoing
 Progressive Era (1890s–1920s)
 Lochner era (c. 1897–c. 1937)

Births
 January 7 – Charles Addams, cartoonist (died 1988)
 January 20 – Walter Briggs, Jr., businessman (died 1970)
 January 27 – Francis Rogallo, aeronautical engineer (died 2009)
 January 28 – Jackson Pollock, abstract expressionist painter (died 1956)
 January 30
 Francis Schaeffer, evangelical theologian, philosopher and Presbyterian pastor (died 1984)
 Barbara Tuchman, historian (died 1989)
 February 7 – Roy Sullivan, park ranger, world record holder for lightning strikes survived (died 1984)
 February 20 – Muriel Humphrey Brown, U.S. Senator from Minnesota in 1978, Second Lady of the United States (died 1998)
 March 13 – Charles Schepens, ophthalmologist, "the father of retinal surgery" and a Nazi resistance movement leader (died 2006)
 March 14
 Les Brown, bandleader (died 2001)
 W. Graham Claytor, Jr., naval officer and railroad executive (died 1994)
 W. Willard Wirtz, administrator (died 2010)
 March 15 – Lightnin' Hopkins, African American country blues musician (died 1982)
 March 16 – Pat Nixon, First Lady of the United States, Second Lady of the United States (died 1993)
 March 17 – Bayard Rustin, African American civil rights activist (died 1987)
 March 24 – Dorothy Height, African American activist (died 2010)
 March 26 – Opaline Deveraux Wadkins, African American nurse educator (died 2000)
 April 1 – Donald Nyrop, businessman (died 2010)
 April 7 – Jack Lawrence, songwriter (died 2009)
 April 13 – William J. Tuttle, makeup artist (died 2007)
 April 19 – Glenn T. Seaborg, nuclear chemist, recipient of Nobel Prize in Chemistry in 1951 (died 1999)
 May 3 – May Sarton, poet, novelist and memoirist (died 1995)
 May 11 – Foster Brooks, comic actor (died 2001)
 May 16 – Studs Terkel, writer and broadcaster (died 2008)
 May 17 
 Archibald Cox, lawyer and politician, 31st United States Solicitor General (died 2004)
 Mary Beatrice Davidson Kenner, inventor (died 2006)
 Ace Parker, baseball and football player (died 2013)
 May 18 – Perry Como, singer (died 2001)
 May 27
 John Cheever, fiction writer (died 1982)
 Sam Snead, golfer (died 2002)
 May 30
 Julius Axelrod, biochemist, recipient of Nobel Prize in Physiology or Medicine in 1970 (died 2004)
 Joseph Stein, librettist (died 2010)
 May 31 – Henry M. Jackson ("Scoop"), politician (died 1983)
 June 3 – Glen Dawson, rock climber and mountaineer (died 2016)
 June 5 – Dean Amadon, ornithologist (died 2003)
 June 9 – Philip Simmons, ornamental ironworker (died 2009)
 June 21 – Mary McCarthy, novelist, critic and political activist (died 1989)
 June 25 – William T. Cahill, politician (died 1996)
 June 29 – John Toland, historian and biographer, recipient of Pulitzer Prize for General Non-Fiction in 1971 (died 2004)
 July 1
 David R. Brower, environmentalist (died 2000)
 Sally Kirkland, fashion editor (died 1989)
 July 11 – William F. Walsh, politician (died 2011)
 July 13 – Ed Sherman, American football player, coach (died 2009)
 July 14 
 Woody Guthrie, folk musician ("This Land Is Your Land") (died 1967)
 Buddy Moreno, American musician (died 2015)
 July 17 – Art Linkletter, television host (House Party) (died 2010)
 July 28 – George Cisar, screen character actor (died 1979)
 July 31
 Milton Friedman, economist, recipient of Nobel Memorial Prize in Economic Sciences in 1976 (died 2006)
 Irv Kupcinet, newspaper columnist (died 2003)
 August 1
 Frank K. Edmondson, astronomer (died 2008)
 Donald Seawell, theater producer and newspaper publisher (died 2015)
 August 2 – Ann Dvorak, actress (died 1979)
 August 9 – Anne Brown, African American soprano (died 2009 in Norway)
 August 11 – Norman Levinson, mathematician (died 1975)
 August 13 – Ben Hogan, golfer (died 1997)
 August 15 – Julia Child, television chef (died 2004)
 August 23 – Gene Kelly, entertainer (died 1996)
 August 30 – Edward Mills Purcell, physicist, recipient of Nobel Prize in Physics in 1952 (died 1997)
 September 5
 John Cage, avant-garde composer (died 1992)
 Frank Thomas, animator (died 2004)
 September 7 – David Packard, electrical engineer (died 1996)
 September 10 – William Everson ("Brother Antoninus"), poet (died 1994)
 September 13 
 Reta Shaw, character actress (died 1982)
 Marian Cannon Schlesinger, artist and author (died 2017)
 September 16 – Don A. Jones, admiral and environmental engineer (died 1976)
 September 21 – Chuck Jones, animator (Warner Brothers) (died 2002)
 October 6
 Perkins Bass, politician (died 2011)
 Pauline LaFon Gore, mother of Al Gore (died 2004)
 October 15 – Nellie Lutcher, African American jazz singer (died 2007)
 October 16 – Clifford Hansen, politician (died 2009)
 October 22 – George N. Leighton, soldier and judge (died 2018) 
 October 25 – Minnie Pearl, humorist (died 1996)
 October 27 – Conlon Nancarrow, composer (died 1997 in Mexico)
 October 31 – Ollie Johnston, animator (died 2008)
 November 14 – Barbara Hutton, socialite (died 1979)
 November 21 – Eleanor Powell, film tap dancer (died 1982)
 November 22 – Paul Zamecnik, molecular biologist (died 2009)
 November 23
 George O'Hanlon, film and voice actor and television writer (died 1989)
 Virginia Prince, born Arnold Lowman, transgender activist (died 2009)
 November 28 – Morris Louis, Color Field painter (died 1962)
 November 30 – Gordon Parks, African American photographer and artist (died 2006)
 December 1 – Minoru Yamasaki, architect (World Trade Center) (died 1986)
 December 4 – Pappy Boyington, U.S. Marine Corps fighter ace (died 1988)
 December 12 – Henry Armstrong, African American boxer (died 1988)
 December 15 – Ray Eames, born Ray-Bernice Kaiser, designer, (died 1988)
 December 22 – Lady Bird Johnson, wife of Lyndon B. Johnson, First Lady of the United States, Second Lady of the United States (died 2007)
 December 28 – James Allen, U.S. Senator from Alabama from 1969 to 1978 (died 1978)
 Genevieve Grotjan Feinstein, mathematician and cryptanalyst (died 2006)
 Walt Partymiller, cartoonist and watercolorist (died 1991)

Deaths
 January 3 – Robley Dunglison Evans, admiral (born 1846)
 January 4 – Clarence Dutton, geologist (born 1841)
 March 19 – Thomas Harrison Montgomery, Jr., zoologist and cell biologist (born 1873)
 March 23 – Mace Greenleaf, actor (born 1872)
 April 3 – Calbraith Perry Rodgers, aviation pioneer (born 1879)
 April 4 – Charles Brantley Aycock, 50th Governor of North Carolina (died 1859)
 April 12 – Clara Barton, nurse (born 1821)
 April 15 – Sinking of the RMS Titanic
 John Jacob Astor IV, businessman (born 1864)
 Archibald Butt, presidential aide (born 1865)
 Jacques Futrelle, mystery author (born 1875)
 Benjamin Guggenheim, businessman (born 1865)
 Francis Davis Millet, painter, sculptor and writer (born 1848)
 Isidor Straus, owner of Macy's (born 1845 in Germany)
 Harry Elkins Widener, bibliophile (born 1885)
 April 18 – Martha Ripley, physician (born 1843)
 May 4 – Nettie Stevens, geneticist (born 1861)
 May 18 – Ferdinand Ludwig Herff, German-American physician (born 1820)
 May 25 – Austin Lane Crothers, politician (born 1860)
 May 30 – Wilbur Wright, aviation pioneer (born 1867)
 June 1
 Daniel Burnham, architect and urban planner (born 1846)
 Philip Parmalee, aviator (born 1887)
 June 16 – Thomas Pollock Anshutz, painter (born 1851) 
 June 26 – Anthony Higgins, U.S. Senator from Delaware from 1889 to 1895 (born 1840)
 June 27 – Frank Furness, Philadelphia architect (born 1839)
 July 1 – Harriet Quimby, aviator (born 1875)
 July 7 – Sarah Platt-Decker, suffragist (born 1856)
 July 24 – Addison Peale Russell, essayist (born 1826)
 July 29 – William D. Washburn, U.S. Senator from Minnesota from 1889 to 1895 and businessman (born 1831)
 August 8 – Ross Winn, anarchist writer and publisher (born 1871)
 August 13 – Horace Howard Furness, Shakespeare scholar (born 1833)
 September 18 – Hernando Money, U.S. Senator from Mississippi from 1897 to 1911 (born 1839)
 October 5 – Lewis Boss, astronomer (b. 1846)
 October 6 – William A. Peffer, U.S. Senator from Kansas from 1891 to 1897 (born 1831)
 October 30 – James S. Sherman, 27th Vice President of the United States from 1909 to 1912 (born 1855)
 November 25 – Isidor Rayner, U.S. senator from Maryland from 1905 to 1912 (born 1850)
 November 28 – Walter Benona Sharp, oil pioneer (born 1870)
 December 18 – Will Carleton, poet (born 1845)
 December 29 – Philip H. Cooper, admiral (born 1844)

See also
 List of American films of 1912
 Timeline of United States history (1900–1929)

References

External links
 

 
1910s in the United States
United States
United States
Years of the 20th century in the United States